The ancient legend of Kadeng Thangjahanba and Tonu Laijinglembi is one of the epic cycles of incarnations of Meitei mythology and folklore, that is originated from Moirang kingdom of Ancient Kangleipak (early Manipur). It concerns the fateful love of Kadeng Thangjahanba, a skilled blacksmith, for the beautiful Tonu Laijinglembi. 
Kadeng Thangjahanba was a highly talented and skilful royal chief metalsmith appointed by King Laijing Ningthou Punsiba of Moirang. Tonu Laijinglembi was the only daughter of Laijing Lakpa, a favourite nobleman of the King of Moirang.

History 
Tonu Laijing Lembi & Kadeng Thangja Hanba are real historical figures who lived in the 12th century during the reign of Moilang king Iwang Puriklai Laijing Punsiba (1138-1210 AD) of Moirang kingdom.

Mythology 
God Thangching (Thangjing) blessed Henjunaha and Lairoulembi to be reborn as Kadeng Thangja Hanba and Tonu Laijing Lembi. Writers and ballad singers of olden times wove the two stories of different lovers, thereby creating a classic tale of love and longing in Meitei literature (Manipuri literature).

Plot 
Kadeng Thangjahanba had no match for the art of blacksmithing, due to which he earned the favour of King Laijing Ningthou Punsiba of Moirang kingdom. He was appointed as the royal chief blacksmith by the ruler.
At the same time, Kadeng Thangjahanba was having a romantic affair with lady Tonu Laijinglembi.
As per the ancient traditional customs of Moirang, Kadeng Thangjahanba was given the duty to go to a hunting expedition to get a number of wild animals from the woods for the annual festival in Moirang. And so, Kadeng Thangjahanba left for the expedition to the woods for many months. 
On the other hand, King Laijing Ningthou Punsiba, having no son to succeed him, was very upset. And so, the king consulted the royal high priest. The priest suggested that the male heir could be achieved only if the king married a lady of the King's namesake. 
Immediately, the king sent his men to find out the ladies in his kingdom, who had similar name to his. 
The king's men found only one lady in the Moirang kingdom, and she was Tonu Laijinglembi. Lady Tonu Laijinglembi's name has the word "Laijing" which is similar to King Laijing Ningthou Punsiba's "Laijing". 
And so, during the absence of Kadeng Thangjahanba, Tonu Laijinglembi and King Laijing Ningthou Punsiba got married. During that time, Tonu Laijinglembi was reluctant but could not deny the royal proposal for the wedding. 
As time passed, Kadeng Thangjahanba returned from his months long hunting expedition. He was shocked to hear the news of his lover getting married. He could do nothing but to weep his heart out silently. 
Kadeng Thangjahanba crafted two beautiful swords. On the side of one sword, the images of Tonu and himself were engraved. On the other side of the sword, the images of Tonu as the young queen and King Laijing Ningthou Punsiba were engraved. Kadeng Thangjahanba presented the swords to the king as gifts. 
Initially, King Laijing Ningthou Punsiba could not understand the meaning of the code images. 
On the other side, Kadeng Thangjahanba got extremely careless of his health, thereby falling seriously ill. He could no longer attend the royal works in the palace. 
The King, being a well wisher and an admirer of Kadeng Thangjahanba, felt deeply concerned about the latter's deteriorating health conditions. Among everyone, Tonu Laijinglembi's grief knew no bounds. Seeing all these, the king realised the meaning of the code images engraved in those swords. Without any hesitation, King Laijing Ningthou Punsiba generously sent Tonu Laijinglembi to the house of Kadeng Thangjahanba.
However, Tonu Laijinglembi was already carrying a child of the king in her womb for some months, when she came to Kadeng Thangjahanba's house.
Defying all the odds, the two lovers finally united and live happily ever after.

Accounts for Sangai deer 

During his hunting expedition, Kadeng Thangjahanba captured and brought a lovely Sangai deer from a place called "Torbung Lamjao" to be presented as a token of love to his lover, Lady Tonu Laijinglembi. 
However, when he found out that his beloved lady was already married to King Laijing Ningthou Punsiba, all his hopes of their happy union were shattered away. And so, with the sorrowful feelings for the pangs of separation, he released the deer in the wild of the Keibul Lamjao (present day Keibul Lamjao National Park area). Since then, Sangai species started living in the Keibul Lamjao region according to folklore.

In contemporary art and culture 
 Tonu Laijinglembi (2014)  It is a drama written by Sarangthem Bormani and directed by B Jugolchandra, shown on 22 March 2014, organised by the Manipur Dramatic Union.
 Tonu Laijinglembi Seitharol (2018)  The Meitei Mayek edition of the book "Tonu Laijinglembi Seitharol" written by Hijam Guno, was released on 28 April 2018.
 Tonu Laijinglembi (2018)  A drama based on the character of the same name, directed by L Bikram of the "Aryan Theatre, Imphal", was released on 30 March 2018 during the 6th All Manipur Folk Drama Festival in Imphal.

See also 
 Akongjamba and Phouoibi
 Henjunaha and Lairoulembi
 Khamba and Thoibi
 Khuyol Haoba and Yaithing Konu

Further reading

Notes

References

External links 

 Kadeng Thangjahanba (Kadeng Thangja Hanba) at 
 Kadeng Thangjahanba at Internet Archive (text contents search) 
 Tonu Laijinglembi (Tonu Laijing Lembi) at 
 Tonu Laijinglembi at Internet Archive (metadata search) 
 Tonu Laijinglembi at Internet Archive (text contents search) 
 Tonu Laijing Lembi at Internet Archive (text contents search)

Epic cycles of incarnations
Love stories
Marriage and religion
Meitei folklore
Meitei mythology
Temporary marriages